Pharos  is a crater on Neptune's moon Proteus. It is named after the Lighthouse of Alexandria, also known as the Pharos of Alexandria. It is currently the only named surface feature on any irregularly shaped moon of Neptune. The impact that created Pharos may have also created Hippocamp, due to how unusually close it is to Proteus.

References 

Surface features of Neptune's moons
Proteus (moon)
Lighthouse of Alexandria